Büyük Ada (literally for "Big Island" in Turkish, a.k.a. Sahip Island) is the largest island which can be seen from the town center of Karaburun town in İzmir, Turkey.

References

Islands of Turkey
İzmir
Islands of İzmir Province
Gulf of İzmir